Punchi Apith Baya Na Dan (Little Us Don't Fear Now) is a 2017 Sri Lankan Sinhala children's adventure film directed by Priyantha Pathirage and co-produced by Priyajanaka Gamage and Sandeep Sanraj. It stars Mahinda Pathirage and Giriraj Kaushalya in lead roles along with Rajitha Hiran, Susantha Chandramali and Milinda Perera. Music composed by Lassana Jayasekara. According to the director, the filming completed four years ago in 2013, but due to many reasons, it took four years to screen the film in 2017. It is the 1283rd Sri Lankan film in the Sinhala cinema.

Plot

Cast
 Mahinda Pathirage as Colombus
 Giriraj Kaushalya as Patty Mudalali
 Rajitha Hiran as Diyasena
 Susantha Chandramali as Wimala
 Milinda Perera as Jayasiri
 Samanthi Lanarol as Siriya
 Nilmini Buwaneka as Nanda
 Wasantha Kumarasiri as OIC
 Tissa Bandaranayake as Chief monk
 Kelum Niroshan as Babayya
 Janaka Priyankara as Lokuu
 Sandeep Sanraj as Babee
 Ranjith Galagedara as Sara

Child cast
 Sachith Chathuranga as Pasindu
 Dilki Nethimini as Rashmi
 Santhus Dilhara as Bhanuka
 Ishani Vidurangana as Tharuka 
 Nimindu Chamil as Shanilka
 Nimen Wickramaratne as Kaluwaa
 Chandeep Wasala as Little monk

Songs

References

2017 films
2010s Sinhala-language films
2010s adventure films
Sri Lankan adventure films